Press Play is the fourth studio album by American hip hop recording artist P. Diddy. It was released on October 17, 2006, by Bad Boy Records. The album was supposed to be his first album released under the "Diddy" stage name, but he couldn’t legally release albums under Diddy after a lawsuit from DJ Richard “Diddy” Dearlove. Press Play was his first release distributed by Warner Music Group's Atlantic Records. Press Play features several guest contributions from Nicole Scherzinger, Christina Aguilera, Keyshia Cole, Brandy, Jamie Foxx, Ciara, Nas, Timbaland, Mary J. Blige, CeeLo Green, Keri Hilson, Big Boi, Mario Winans, Avant and Fergie, among others. Primarily dance-pop and hip hop-oriented in sound, it is a loose conceptual album that contains the lyrical themes discussing the concerns to the ups and downs of his relationship.

The album supports 4 hit singles "Come to Me", "Tell Me, "Last Night" and "Through the Pain (She Told Me)". It became available to the preview on MTV's The Leak on October 10, 2006, one week before the album was sold in stores. Press Play received generally mixed to positive reviews from music critics.

Track listing
Credits adapted from the album's liner notes.

Limited edition
 The limited edition version of the album includes a story of photos on how  P. Diddy met a woman in a club. The album is located in a pocket on the last page; as well as these exclusive versions that were released from Target and Best Buy, Target having a bonus DVD and Best Buy including a bonus track, called "Get Off".

Notes
 signifies a co-producer
 signifies an additional producer

Sample credits
List of samples used in Press Play:

Testimonial (Intro)
"Head Over Heels" by Tears for Fears

We Gon' Make It
"Shaft in Africa" by Johnny Pate

I Am (Interlude)
Excerpts from "You've Made Me So Very Happy" by Lou Rawls

Hold Up
Excerpts from "White Shutters" by Jerry Peters

Special Feeling
"Baby I'm a Star" by Prince

Making It Hard
Excerpts from "I Need Love" by Hunts Determination

Last Night
"Erotic City" by Prince

Personnel

Production
 Sean "Diddy" Combs
 The Hitmen
 Danja
 Rob Lewis
 Just Blaze
 Timbaland
 Kanye West
 will.i.am
 The Neptunes
 Rich Harrison
 Havoc
 Jai

Writing credits:

 The Game and Aasim - "We Gon' Make It"
 Pharoahe Monch - "The Future", "Hold Up"
 Jody Breeze (from Boyz n da Hood) -  "Wanna Move", "Through the Pain (She Told Me)", "After Love"
 T.I. - "Wanna Move"
 Mista Raja - "Come to Me"
 Ludacris - "Diddy Rock"
 Royce Da 5'9" - "Tell Me"
 Ness (formerly of Da Band) & Matthew Winans - "Diddy Rock"
 Yummy Bingham and Aasim - "Tell Me"
 Yummy Bingham and Cardan - "Tell Me"
 Static Major - "Tell Me"
 Black Rob and Aasim - "Partners for Life"
 Mike Brown - "Last Night", "Diddy Rock"
 Nas and Aasim - "Everything I Love"
 Ryan Cardona - "Last Night"
 Michael "Ace" McWhorter & Matthew Winans - "Wanna Move", "Last Night", "Through the Pain"

Charts

Weekly charts

Year-end charts

Certifications

References

External links
 Press Play at Discogs
 Press Play at Metacritic
 Album Review at About.com

2006 albums
Sean Combs albums
Bad Boy Records albums
Albums produced by Sean Combs
Albums produced by Danja (record producer)
Albums produced by Rich Harrison
Albums produced by Timbaland
Albums produced by will.i.am
Albums produced by Kanye West
Albums produced by the Neptunes
Albums produced by Just Blaze
Albums produced by K-Def
Albums produced by Havoc (musician)